O'Daniel may refer to:

Dorian O'Daniel (born 1994), American football linebacker
Ed O'Daniel (born 1938), American politician in the state of Kentucky
John W. O'Daniel (1894–1975), aka "Iron Mike", a senior United States Army officer in World War I, World War II and the Korean War
Nicky O'Daniel, American actress on stage and screen
W. Lee O'Daniel, aka "Pappy" O'Daniel (1890–1969), American Democratic Party politician from Texas and radio host
William L. O'Daniel (1923–2017), American farmer and politician

See also
W. Lee O'Daniel (and the Light Crust Dough Boys)", a song written by James Talley and originally recorded by Johnny Cash
Pat O'Daniel and His Hillbilly Boys, Texan Western swing band with its own radio program during the mid-1930s
Daniel